Jacob Haish (March 9, 1826 – February 19, 1926) was one of the first inventors of barbed wire. His type of barbed wire was in direct competition with the other barbed wire manufacturers in DeKalb, Illinois. He was a known carpenter and architect in DeKalb County and designed several prominent DeKalb homes.

Early life
Haish was born in Baden, Germany on March 9, 1826, and immigrated with his family to the United States in 1835. He came to Illinois in 1845, married Sophie Ann Brown in 1847, and moved to DeKalb in 1853, where he was a carpenter. He cultivated osage orange hedges whose thorns made them effective as cattle fencing.

The birth of barbed wire
In late 1872, Henry Rose developed a wire fence with an attached wooden strip containing projecting wire points to dissuade encroaching livestock. He patented his fence in May 1873 and exhibited it at the DeKalb County Fair that summer. This prompted Haish and other DeKalb residents Isaac Ellwood and Joseph Glidden to work on improving the concept.  Haish had patented three styles of barbed fencing by June 1874. When Haish's patent for an "S-barb" design was granted in August 1875, he launched a drawn out legal battle to stymie his rivals. It failed at the US Supreme Court in 1895.

Haish gifts a library
In 1893, the city council of DeKalb, Illinois, decreed the establishment of a public library.  The impetus for this ordinance was requests from the Ladies of the Library Association, a group that had conducted a reading room for several years. The library moved twice before the Haish gift came along; it was first located on the second floor of the city hall and then, in 1923, moved to the second floor of the DeKalb Daily Chronicle building on Lincoln Highway.

Jacob Haish died at his home in DeKalb on February 19, 1926. He had bequested a $150,000 gift for a library building in his will. The result was the Haish Memorial Library in downtown DeKalb.

See also
 George H. Gurler House
 Joseph F. Glidden House

References

External links
Jacob Haish biographical timeline

About the Library: DeKalb Public Library
Location of Haish mansion built in 1884, demolished in 1961

Haish patents
  – Jacob Haish, DeKalb, Illinois, Improvement in Wire Fences – "spirally wrapped wires, the ends being hooked together to form projecting spikes" (January, 1874)
  – Improvement in Barbed Fences – "sheet metal pronged attachments", riveted or nailed to fence rails (February, 1874)
  – Barbed-Wire Fences – "twisted wires and spirally interwoven metallic strip having projecting spurs" (June, 1874)
  – Improvement in Wire-fence Barbs – "single piece of wire bent into the form of the letter S" so that both strands are clasped (August, 1875) This improvement was the foundation for Haish's successful business.

19th-century American inventors
People from DeKalb, Illinois
American architects
1826 births
1926 deaths